WHTR-LP (96.9 FM) was a radio station licensed to Wakulla County, Florida, United States. The station was owned by St. Marks Trail Association.

The Federal Communications Commission cancelled the station's license on February 4, 2020, due to the station failing to file an application for license renewal.

References

External links
 

HTR-LP
HTR-LP
Radio stations established in 2005
2005 establishments in Florida
Defunct radio stations in the United States
Radio stations disestablished in 2020
2020 disestablishments in Florida
HTR-LP